Fjord, Norway may refer to
Fjord City, a project for urban renewal in Oslo, a city with 690,335 inhabitants
Fjord (municipality), a municipality with 2,672 inhabitants in Møre og Romsdal
Fjords of Norway

Norway also has numerous placenames that include the word "fjord."